Masatake Kuranishi (倉西 正武 Kuranishi Masatake; July 19, 1924 – June 22, 2021) was a Japanese mathematician who worked on several complex variables, partial differential equations, and differential geometry.

Education and career
Kuranishi received in 1952 his Ph.D. from Nagoya University. He became a lecturer there in 1951, an associate professor in 1952, and a full professor in 1958. From 1955 to 1956 he was a visiting scholar at the Institute for Advanced Study in Princeton, New Jersey. From 1956 to 1961 he was a visiting professor at the University of Chicago, the Massachusetts Institute of Technology, and Princeton University. He became a professor at Columbia University in the summer of 1961.

Kuranishi was an invited speaker at the International Congress of Mathematicians in 1962 at Stockholm with the talk On deformations of compact complex structures and in 1970 at Nice with the talk Convexity conditions related to 1/2 estimate on elliptic complexes. He was a Guggenheim Fellow for the academic year 1975–1976. In 2000 he received the Stefan Bergman Prize. In 2014 he received the Geometry Prize of the Mathematical Society of Japan.

Research
Kuranishi and Élie Cartan established the eponymous Cartan–Kuranishi Theorem on the continuation of exterior differential forms. In 1962, based upon the work of Kunihiko Kodaira and Donald Spencer, Kuranishi constructed locally complete deformations of compact complex manifolds.

In 1982 he made important progress in the embedding problem for CR manifolds (Cauchy–Riemann structures).

Thus, by Kuranishi's work, in real dimension 9 and higher, local embedding of abstract CR structures is true and is also true in real dimension 7 by the work of Akahori. A simplified presentation of Kuranishi's proof is due to Sidney Webster. For  (i.e., real dimension 3), Nirenberg published a counterexample. The local embedding problem remains open in real dimension 5.

Selected publications
Heisuke Hironaka (ed.): Masatake Kuranishi - Selected Papers, Springer 2010
Kuranishi: Deformations of compact complex manifolds, Montreal, Presses de l'Universite de Montreal, 1971, 99 pages.
Kuranishi: Lectures on involutive systems of partial differential equations, Sociedade de matemática de São Paulo, 1967, 75 pages.
Kuranishi with notes by M.K. Venkatesha Murthy: Lectures on exterior differential systems, Tata Institute of Fundamental Research, 1962.

See also
Kuranishi structure

References

External links
Conference at Columbia University in honor of Kuranishi's 80th birthday, 2005

1924 births
2021 deaths
20th-century Japanese mathematicians
21st-century Japanese mathematicians
20th-century American mathematicians
21st-century American mathematicians
Differential geometers
PDE theorists
Nagoya University alumni
Academic staff of Nagoya University
Columbia University faculty
People from Tokyo
Japanese emigrants to the United States
Institute for Advanced Study visiting scholars